HMS Amaranthus (K17) was a Flower-class corvette of the Royal Navy. She took part in the Second World War, being involved in escorting convoys from West Africa to the United Kingdom from May 1941 onwards.

Design and construction
The Flower-class arose as a result of the Royal Navy's realisation in the late 1930s that it had a shortage of escort vessels, particularly coastal escorts for use on the East coast of Britain, as the likelihood of war with Germany increased. To meet this urgent requirement, a design developed based on the whale-catcher Southern Pride - this design was much more capable than Naval trawlers, but cheaper and quicker to build than the Hunt-class destroyers or  sloops that were alternatives for the coastal escort role.

Displacement was about  standard and  full load.

Design armament was a single BL 4-inch Mk IX naval gun forward and a single 2-pounder "pom-pom" anti-aircraft cannon aft, although the pom-poms were not available until 1941, so early ships were completed with improvised close-range anti aircraft armament such as Lewis guns or Vickers .50 machine guns instead.

Amaranthus was one of a group of ten Flower-class corvettes ordered by the Admiralty on 21 September 1939. The ship was laid down at the Scottish shipbuilder Fleming and Ferguson's Paisley shipyard as Yard number 563 on 4 May 1940. She was launched on 17 October 1940 and completed on 12 February 1941.

Wartime Service

References 

Ships
Ships of the United Kingdom
Corvettes
Flower-class corvettes
Flower-class corvettes of the Royal Navy
Ships built in Scotland
Paisley, Renfrewshire